Olympic Soccer is a 1996 association football video game developed by Silicon Dreams and published by U.S. Gold, released for the PlayStation, 3DO Interactive Multiplayer, Sega Saturn, and MS-DOS compatible operating systems. A Panasonic M2 version never completed because of the system's cancellation.

Playable teams
32 national football teams are playable in the game. These are:

Gameplay
Olympic Soccer is a soccer game that offers expanded control aspects for the players and enables many special maneuvers.

Reception
Next Generation reviewed the PlayStation version of the game, rating it three stars out of five, and stated that "if general entertainment ranks above true realism in your criteria for soccer games, Olympic Soccer will fit the bill precisely."

Next Generation reviewed the 3DO version of the game, rating it three stars out of five, and stated that "It still can't compete with FIFA, especially given they're both available for 3DO, but for a fast-paced, exciting one- or two-player game, the 3DO doesn't have many games of this caliber."

Reviews
Electronic Gaming Monthly (Jul, 1996)
Mean Machines - Aug, 1996
IGN - Nov 25, 1996
PC Games - Nov, 1996

References

1996 video games
3DO Interactive Multiplayer games
Association football video games
Cancelled Panasonic M2 games
DOS games
PlayStation (console) games
Sega Saturn games
Video games developed in the United Kingdom